Kazakh Khanate – Golden Throne is a 2019 Kazakhstani drama film directed by Rustem Abdrashev. It was selected as the Kazakhstani entry for the Best International Feature Film at the 92nd Academy Awards, but it was not nominated. The film is the second in a series, which was launched with Diamond Sword in 2017.

Cast
 Yerkebulan Daiyrov
 Khulan Chuluun
 Igilik Naryn
 Zarina Yeva
 Yerlan Amina

See also
 List of submissions to the 92nd Academy Awards for Best International Feature Film
 List of Kazakhstani submissions for the Academy Award for Best International Feature Film

References

External links
 

2019 films
2019 drama films
Kazakhstani historical drama films
Kazakh-language films